The following are the football (soccer) events of the year 1952 throughout the world.

Events
 21 September – East Germany plays its first ever international match, losing 3–0 to Poland in Warsaw.

Undated:
 Rudnianka Rudna Wielka, professional Polish football club is founded.

Winners club national championship
: KS Dinamo Tirana
: River Plate
: Rapid Vienna
: RFC Liégeois
: PFC CSKA Sofia
: Sparta CKD Sokolovo
: AB
: ZSG Union Halle
: Manchester United F.C.
: KÍ Klaksvík
: KTP
: OGC Nice
: tournament not held
: Budapest Honvéd FC
: KR
: St Patrick's Athletic F.C.
: Juventus F.C.
: National Schifflange
: León
: Willem II
: Glenavon F.C.
: FK Sparta Sarpsborg
: Ruch Chorzów
: Sporting CP
: CCA București
: Hibernian F.C.
: FC Barcelona
: IFK Norrköping
: Grasshopper Club Zürich
: VfB Stuttgart
: FC Spartak Moscow
: Hajduk Split

International tournaments
1952 British Home Championship (6 October 1951 – 5 April 1952)

Olympic Games in Helsinki, Finland (15 July – 2 August 1952)

Births
 1 January – Ítalo Estupiñán, Ecuadorian international footballer (died 2016)
 2 February – Reinhard Häfner, German international footballer (died 2016)
 2 February – Fernando Morena, Uruguayan international footballer
 8 February – Marinho Chagas, Brazilian international footballer (died 2014)
 20 March – Steve Whitworth, English footballer
 2 May – Martin Haar, Dutch footballer and assistant-coach
 17 May – Jorge Olguin, Argentine international footballer
 19 May – Bert van Marwijk, Dutch footballer and coach
 22 May – Waldemar Victorino, Uruguayan international footballer
 2 August – Alain Giresse, French international footballer and coach
 3 August – Osvaldo Ardiles, Argentinian international footballer and coach
 7 August – Kees Kist, Dutch international footballer
 6 September – Vladimir Kazachyonok, Soviet international footballer and Russian coach (died 2017)
 5 November – Harry Schellekens, Dutch footballer
 17 November – Roman Ogaza, Polish international footballer (died 2006)
 20 November – Vince O'Kane, English former professional footballer
 25 November – Gabriele Oriali, Italian international footballer
 3 December – Hervé Gorce, French professional footballer (died 2008)
 15 December – Allan Simonsen, Danish international footballer

Deaths

References

 
Association football by year